NGC 466 is a lenticular galaxy located about 227 million light-years away from Earth in the constellation Tucana. NGC 466 was discovered by  astronomer John Herschel on October 3, 1836.

Group Membership
NGC 466 is a member of a group of galaxies known as GG 019.

See also  
 Lenticular galaxy 
 NGC 7302
 List of NGC objects (1–1000)

References

External links 

Lenticular galaxies
Tucana (constellation)
0466
4632
Astronomical objects discovered in 1836